This article lists the squads for the 2017 Cyprus Women's Cup, the 10th edition of the Cyprus Women's Cup. The cup consisted of a series of friendly games, and was held in Cyprus from 1 to 8 March 2017. The twelve national teams involved in the tournament registered a squad of 23 players.

The age listed for each player is on 1 March 2017, the first day of the tournament. The numbers of caps and goals listed for each player do not include any matches played after the start of tournament. The club listed is the club for which the player last played a competitive match prior to the tournament. The nationality for each club reflects the national association (not the league) to which the club is affiliated. A flag is included for coaches that are of a different nationality than their own national team.

Group A

Belgium
Coach: Ives Serneels

The squad was announced on 15 February 2017. On 27 February 2017, Sarah Wijnants replaced Laura De Neve due to a muscle tear suffered during a club match. Diede Lemey was replaced by Lisa Lichtfus after the competition's second match, due to school obligations.

Italy
Coach: Antonio Cabrini

The squad was announced on 20 February 2017.

North Korea
Coach: Kim Kwang-min

Switzerland
Coach:  Martina Voss-Tecklenburg

The squad was announced on 9 February 2017. Vanessa Bürki replaced Meriame Terchoun before the beginning of the competition.

Group B

Austria
Coach: Dominik Thalhammer

The squad was announced on 14 February 2017.

New Zealand
Coach:  Tony Readings

The squad was announced on 11 February 2017.

Scotland
Coach:  Anna Signeul

The squad was announced on 14 February 2017.

South Korea
Coach: Yoon Deok-yeo

The squad was announced on 3 February 2017.

Group C

Czech Republic
Coach: Karel Brückner

The squad was announced on 10 February 2017.

Hungary
Coach: Edina Markó

The squad was announced on 27 February 2017.

Ireland
Coach:  Colin Bell

The squad was announced on 13 February 2017. On 28 February 2017, Bell announced the additions of Marie Hourihan, Claire O'Riordan, and Harriet Scott to the squad.

Wales
Coach: Jayne Ludlow

The squad was announced on 13 February 2017.

Player representation
Statistics are per the beginning of the competition.

By club
Clubs with 5 or more players represented are listed.

By club nationality

By club federation

By representatives of domestic league

References

2017